Neath is a market town and community situated in the Neath Port Talbot County Borough, Wales. The town had a population of 50,658 in 2011. The community of the parish of Neath had a population of 19,258 in 2011.

Etymology
The town's English name ultimately derives from "" the original Welsh name for the River Neath and is known to be Celtic or Pre-Celtic. A meaning of 'shining' or 'brilliant' has been suggested, as has a link to the older Indo-European root  (simply meaning 'river').

As such, the town may share its etymology with the town of Stratton, Cornwall and the River Nidd in Northern England.

History

Roman fort

The town is located at a ford of the River Neath and its strategic situation is evident by a number of Celtic hill forts, surrounding the town. The Romans also recognised the area's strategic importance and built an Auxiliary Fort on the river's Western bank around 74 AD.

Much of the site is on the grounds of Dwr-y-Felin Comprehensive School but archaeological digs have also found gate-towers that extended out beyond the fort's walls (a feature unique in Roman Britain) and a large Roman marching camp that would have accommodated thousands of troops. These finds indicate some of the unusual measures the Romans took during the resistance of the native Silures. The fort at Neath was abandoned around 125 AD for fifteen years and again around 170 AD for a century before the final Roman withdrawal around 320 AD.

The Antonine Itinerary names  (or ) as one of nine places in Roman Wales.

Medieval period

St Illtyd visited the Neath area and established a settlement in what is now known as Llantwit on the northern edge of the town. The church of St Illtyd was built at this settlement and was enlarged in Norman times. The Norman and pre-Norman church structure remains intact and active to day within the Church in Wales.

Industrial and modern Neath
Neath was a market town that expanded with the arrival of the Industrial Revolution in the 18th century with new manufacturing industries of iron, steel and tinplate. The Mackworth family, who owned the Gnoll Estate were prominent in the town's industrial development. Coal was mined extensively in the surrounding valleys and the construction of canals and railways made Neath a major transportation centre and the Evans & Bevan families were major players in the local coal mining community as well as owning the Vale of Neath Brewery. The town continued as a market trading centre with a municipal cattle market run by W.B.Trick.

Admiral Lord Nelson stayed at the Castle Hotel en route to Milford Haven when the fleet was at anchor there. Lt. Lewis Roatley, the son of the landlord of the Castle Hotel, served as a Royal Marines officer with Nelson aboard  in the Battle of Trafalgar.

The River Neath is a navigable estuary and Neath was a river port until recent times. The heavy industries are no more; the town is now a commercial and tourism centre. Attractions for visitors are the ruins of the Cistercian Neath Abbey, the Gnoll Park, and Neath Indoor Market.

Neath hosted the National Eisteddfod of Wales in 1918, 1934 and 1994.

Notable people
See :Category:People from Neath

Roger Blake (1957– ), actor, entertainer and impressionist;
Mark Bowen (1963–, b. Briton Ferry), Former manager of Reading FC, and played for Spurs and Norwich City;
Hugh Dalton (1887–1962, b. Gnoll), Labour politician, Chancellor of the Exchequer, 1945–1947;
Ben Davies (1993– ), Tottenham Hotspur, and Wales footballer;
David Davies, (1877–1944), Welsh international rugby union forward;
Ivor Emmanuel (1927–2007), singer and actor;
Hugh Evan-Thomas, vice-admiral;
Craig Evans (born 1971), cricketer;
Rebecca Evans (1963–, b. Pontrhydyfen), soprano;
Sir Samuel Thomas Evans (1859–1918, b. Skewen), politician and judge;
George Grant Francis (1814–1882, b. Swansea) historian who wrote Original Charters and Materials for a History of Neath (1845);
Julie Gardner (1969– ), television producer previously responsible for Doctor Who and its spin-off Torchwood, former executive producer of Scripted Projects at BBC Worldwide and co-founder of Bad Wolf Productions;
Richard Grant (born 1984), cricketer;
Cecil Griffiths (1900–1945), winner of an Olympic gold medal in the 4x400m relay at the 1920 Antwerp Olympics;
Howel Gwyn (1806-1888), Conservative politician;
Thomas Haffield (1988– ), Great Britain Olympic swimmer;
Carl Harris (1956– ), the former Leeds United and Wales international;
Richard Hibbard (1983– ), Rugby player for the Dragons of the Pro14;
T. G. H. James (1923–2009), Egyptologist and former Keeper of Egyptian Antiquities at the British Museum;
Sir William Jenkins (1871–1944), former Neath MP;
Katherine Jenkins (1980– ), popular classical mezzo-soprano;
Margaret Townsend Jenkins (1843–1923), Canadian clubwoman
Della Jones (1946, b. Tonna), mezzo-soprano;
Kristian Lavercombe (1976–), actor and singer
Geraint F. Lewis (1969– ), leading astrophysicist;
Andy Legg (1966– ), former professional footballer and Wales international;
Tony Lewis (1938–, b. Swansea), first Welshman to Captain an England cricket tour abroad, (India, Pakistan, 1972–73). Led Glamorgan to 2nd County Championship, 1969.  Writer and broadcaster.
Andrew Matthews-Owen, pianist;
Ray Milland (1907–1986), Oscar-winning Hollywood actor;
Craig Mitchell (1986– ), Welsh international rugby union forward;
David Watts Morgan (1867–1933), miners' leader and politician;
Sir William Nott (1782–1845), British General in India;
Harry Parr-Davies (1914–1955), composer;
Jessie Penn-Lewis (1861–1927), missioner and revivalist;
Gary Pickford-Hopkins (1948–2013) singer, composer and guitarist; 
Sir Arthur Pugh (1870–1955, b. Ross-on-Wye, Herefordshire), trade unionist, moved to his father's birthplace, Neath, 1894;
Henry Habberley Price (1899–1984), philosopher;
Walter Enoch Rees (1863–1949), rugby administrator;
Andrew Rhodes (1977– ), civil servant, Registrar and Chief Operating Officer of Swansea University
Paul Rhys (1963– ), actor;
Craig Richards (1959– ), former professional footballer
Connor Roberts (1995– ), Welsh international footballer;
Will Roberts (1907–2000, b. Ruabon, Denbighshire), artist, moved to Neath 1918;
Peter Shreeves (1940– ), former Spurs and Sheffield Wednesday manager;
Samuel Charles Silkin, Baron Silkin of Dulwich (1918–1988), barrister and politician, Attorney-General, 1974–1979;
Jonathan Spratt (1986– ), Welsh rugby player
William Squire (1917–1989), actor;
David Thaxton (1982– ), West End performer
Brian Thomas (1940–2012), Wales rugby union lock who also played and managed Neath RFC;
Bonnie Tyler (1951–, b. Skewen), pop star;
Andrew Vicari (1938–2016), artist;
Ron Waldron (1933– ), Welsh rugby coach;
Alfred Russel Wallace (1823, b. Monmouthshire), evolutionary theorist, lived in Neath during 1841/2 and attended lectures given by the area's scientific societies;
Cyril Walters (1905–1992), Glamorgan cricketer and Captain of the England cricket team;
Anna Letitia Waring (1823–1910), poet and hymn writer;
Elijah Waring (1788–1857), writer; and
Jane Williams [called Llinos] (1795–1873), singer and compiler of traditional Welsh music.

Sport

The Welsh Rugby Union was formed at a meeting held at the Castle Hotel in 1881. Neath Rugby Football Club, the famous and successful "Welsh All Blacks", play at The Gnoll.

Motorcycle speedway was staged at the Abbey Stadium in Neath in 1962. The Welsh Dragons, led by New Zealander Trevor Redmond, raced with some success in the Provincial League but, because of local problems, a number of the "home" fixtures were raced at St Austell. The Dragons introduced the Australian rider Charlie Monk to British speedway. After a season at Long Eaton Archers, Monk went on to have considerable success at Glasgow. The team also featured South African Howdy Cornell. In the early 1960s there was also stock car racing held at Neath Abbey, opposite the monastery

Neath Athletic A.F.C. was the town's largest football team, playing at Neath RFC's ground, The Gnoll, and played in the top flight of Welsh football, the Welsh Premier League, until the club was wound up in 2012. In the 2006–07 season, Neath Athletic A.F.C. were promoted from the Welsh Football League First Division to the Welsh Premier League. Neath Athletic A.F.C. had an average of 300 supporters attending a domestic, Welsh Premier League game, which was typical of the Welsh Premier League.

Administration

After Neath became a municipal borough in 1835, the borough council was based at Neath Town Hall in Church Place before relocating to Gwyn Hall in Orchard Street in 1888. Neath District Council, which was formed in 1974, was absorbed into the larger unitary authority of Neath Port Talbot on 1 April 1996.  The town encompasses the electoral wards of Neath East, Neath North, Neath South and Cimla.

For the House of Commons at Westminster, Neath and the surrounding area are part of the Neath constituency.  , its Member of Parliament (MP) is Christina Rees of the Labour Party.

In the Senedd, the Neath Senedd constituency is represented by Jeremy Miles (Labour), and by the wider South Wales West electoral region returns four additional Members of the Senedd (MSs).

Climate

As with the rest of the British Isles, Neath experiences a maritime climate with cool summers and mild winters, often high winds, and low sunshine levels.

Education

Dwr-y-Felin Comprehensive School is situated on the outskirts of the town, opposite a campus of NPTC Group (which was previously Neath Port Talbot College. Cefn Saeson Comprehensive School is in the village of Cimla. Two other comprehensive schools serve the town: Llangatwg Comprehensive School in Cadoxton and Ysgol Bae Baglan in Baglan.

Transport

Neath railway station is on the South Wales Main Line.

Neath bus station is at Victoria Gardens, a five-minute walk from the railway station. National Express services call at the railway station. From Victoria Gardens, First Cymru provides direct inter-urban services to nearby Swansea and Port Talbot in addition to South Wales Transport who provide many similar local services.

The A465 skirts the town to the north east and provides a link to the M4.

Plans
The site once occupied by the previous civic centre was to be redeveloped as a new shopping centre. The area around the Milland Road Industrial Estate and with the area around the Neath Canal were also to be redeveloped. The proposals included an "iconic" golden rugby ball-shaped museum, a library, heritage centre and other new facilities.

In March 2008, the county's new radio station, Afan FM, announced plans to install a new transmitter for the Neath area. This would give residents of Neath access to the radio station, which already transmitted to the neighbouring area of Port Talbot. The new transmitter for the Neath area was commissioned by Government regulator Ofcom on Thursday 23 October 2008.

Galleries

References

External links

History of Neath
Neath Port Talbot Council Adult Learning Portal
www.geograph.co.uk : photos of Neath and surrounding area
Wiki style Map of the neath area
Photo Archive Gallery of old Neath & District

 
Communities in Neath Port Talbot
Towns in Neath Port Talbot
Vale of Neath
Swansea Bay (region)